Black Banks is a settlement in Prince Edward Island.

The name "Black Banks", comes from the black peat moss that covers the area. There also has been many shipwrecks in the general area, such as The Queen Elizabeth.

Communities in Prince County, Prince Edward Island